Abdulkadir Abdinur Hashi is a Somali politician. He previously served as the Minister of State for Planning and International Cooperation of Puntland, and is a Member of the Federal Parliament of Somalia.

Personal life
Hashi hails from Galkayo in the northeastern Puntland region of Somalia. He belongs to the Leelkase Tanade Darod clan.

Career

Minister of the Presidency for Planning and International Relations of Puntland
On 1 March 2010, Hashi was appointed Puntland's State Minister of the Presidency for Planning and International Relations during a cabinet reshuffle.

Federal Parliament
On 20 August 2012, Hashi's term in office ended, when he was among the legislators nominated to the newly established Federal Parliament of Somalia.

Minister of Constitutional Affairs of Somalia
On 17 January 2015, Hashi was appointed the new Minister of Constitutional Affairs-designate of Somalia by Prime Minister Omar Abdirashid Ali Sharmarke.

Minister of Education, Culture and Higher Learning
On 24 June 2016, Hashi was appointed the new Minister of Education of Somalia by Prime Minister Omar Abdirashid Ali Sharmarke.  

Has been awarded Honorary membership of Legis Chambers (14 Red Lion Square, London WC1R 4QH, www.legischambers.com) for unique experiences and deep understanding of the socio-economic background as well as dynamics of clan and political culture in Somalia and his efforts to bring the rule of law to Somalia

See also
Ali Haji Warsame

References

External links
Federal Parliament of Somalia - Abdulkadir Abdi Hashi

Darod
Living people
Ethnic Somali people
Somalian politicians
Somalian Muslims
Year of birth missing (living people)
Place of birth missing (living people)